Frédéric le Peutrec (born 20 June 1965) is a French sailor. He competed in the Tornado event at the 1996 Summer Olympics.

References

External links
 

1965 births
Living people
French male sailors (sport)
Olympic sailors of France
Sailors at the 1996 Summer Olympics – Tornado
Sportspeople from Paris